Albert Vete (born 24 January 1993) is a Tonga international rugby league footballer who plays as a  and  for Castleford Tigers in the Betfred Super League.

He previously played for the New Zealand Warriors and the Melbourne Storm in the National Rugby League (NRL).

Background
Vete was born in Auckland, New Zealand. He is of Tongan descent.

Vete was educated at Saint Kentigern College, playing rugby union and captaining their first XV to the Auckland title.

Playing career

Early years
Vete switched to rugby league in 2012, signing with the New Zealand Warriors and playing in their under 20's side while studying towards a Bachelor of Physical Education. Vete was part of the Junior Warriors side that played in 2013 Holden Cup Grand Final against the Penrith Panthers juniors, playing at prop and scoring a try in the 30–42 loss.

On 13 October 2013, Vete played for the Junior Kiwis against the Junior Kangaroos at prop in the Kiwis' 26–38 loss. In 2014 Vete joined the full-time squad and played in 19 games in the New South Wales Cup for the Warriors.

2015
In Round 1 of the 2015 NRL season, Vete made his first grade NRL debut for the New Zealand Warriors against the Newcastle Knights off the interchange bench in the Warriors 24–14 loss at Hunter Stadium.  On 2 May 2015, Vete played for Tonga against Samoa in the Polynesian Cup, playing off the interchange bench in Tonga's 16–18 loss at Cbus Super Stadium. On 7 July 2015, Vete re-signed with the Warriors on a 2-year contract to the end of the 2017 season. In Round 20 against the Manly-Warringah Sea Eagles, Vete scored his first NRL career try in the Warriors 32–12 loss at Mt Smart Stadium. Vete finished his debut year in the NRL with him playing in 21 matches and scoring 2 tries. On 17 October 2015, Vete played for Tonga in their Asia-Pacific Qualifier match against the Cook Islands for the 2017 Rugby League World Cup. He played at prop in Tonga's 28–8 win at Campbelltown Stadium.

2016
In February, Vete played for the Warriors in the 2016 NRL Auckland Nines.

On 2 May, The New Zealand Herald reported five players were stood down from an international test match for mixing prescription drugs with energy drinks on a night out.  The recipe can emulate the effect of illicit drugs.  Vete was one of the players named who was involved in the activity.

2018
In July, Vete was a mid season trade from the Warriors. He made his Melbourne Storm debut against St. George Illawarra in their round 17 clash.

2019
In the 2019 NRL season, Vete made only one appearance which came against St. George Illawarra in round 16 where Melbourne won 16–14.

2020
Vete made only six appearances for Melbourne in the 2020 NRL season.  He did not play in the finals series or the 2020 NRL Grand Final for Melbourne.  At the end of the season, he signed a contract to join Hull KR.

2021
In round 18 of the 2021 Super League season, Vete was controversially sent to the sin bin during Hull KR's 34–28 victory over Leigh.
In the elimination play off match against Warrington, Vete was sent to the sin bin during Hull KR's 19–0 victory.  Vete made a total of 13 appearances including the club's semi-final defeat against the Catalans Dragons.

2022
On 29 August, it was announced that Vete would be one of eleven players who were to depart Hull Kingston Rovers at the end of the 2022 season.

On 24 September it was announced that he had signed a two-year deal to join Castleford Tigers.

References

External links

Melbourne Storm profile
New Zealand Warriors profile

1993 births
Living people
Castleford Tigers players
Hull Kingston Rovers players
Junior Kiwis players
Melbourne Storm players
New Zealand sportspeople of Tongan descent
New Zealand expatriate sportspeople in England
Expatriate sportspeople in Australia
New Zealand rugby league players
New Zealand Warriors players
People educated at Saint Kentigern College
Rugby league players from Auckland
Rugby league props
Tonga national rugby league team players
Tongan sportspeople